Chizhovka-Arena (or Čyžoŭka-Arena,) is a multi-purpose indoor arena in Čyžoŭka microdistrict of Minsk, Belarus. Its full name is "Шматфункцыянальны культурна-спартыўны і забаўляльны комплекс «Чыжоўка-Арэна»".

Opened in December 2013, it is mostly used for concerts, ice hockey and other indoor sporting activities. The main arena has a capacity of 8,807 people and the training arena has 473 seats. The project of Chizhovka-Arena was changed several times. The final project was approved in 2010.

Events

It was listed as one of two main venues for the 2014 Men's World Ice Hockey Championships. The arena hosted the 2017 final of the ITF Fed Cup, a women's team tennis event.

See also
 2014 IIHF World Championships

References

External links

Announcement of new arena

Indoor arenas in Belarus
Ice hockey venues in Belarus
Sports venues completed in 2013
2013 establishments in Belarus